Iheyaspira is a genus of sea snails, marine gastropod mollusks in the family Skeneidae.

Species
Species within the genus Iheyaspira include:
 Iheyaspira bathycodon Nye, Copley, Linse & Plouviez, 2013
 Iheyaspira lequios Okutani, Sasaki & Tsuchida, 2000

References

 Okutani T., Sasaki T. & Tsuchida S. 2000: Two additional new species to gastropod fauna of chemosynthetic site on north knoll of Iheya ridge, Okinawa trough. Venus 59(4): 267-275
 Nye, Copley, Linse & Plouviez, 2013,  Iheyaspira bathycodon new species (Vetigastropoda: Trochoidea: Turbinidae: Skeneinae) from the Von Damm Vent Field, Mid-Cayman Spreading Centre, Caribbean. Journal of the Marine Biological Association of the United Kingdom, 2013;93(4):1017-1024.

 
Skeneidae
Gastropod genera